The Gandhi Bhavan Metro Station is located on the Red Line of the Hyderabad Metro. It is near to Care Hospital, Ram Ki Bandi , Hotel Shadab and Numaish Exhibition Grounds.

History 
It was opened on 24 September 2018.

Facilities

References

Hyderabad Metro stations